Alfonso de Franco y Luna (1572–1645) was a Catholic prelate who served as Bishop of La Paz (1639–1645) and Bishop of Durango (1632–1639).

Biography
Alfonso de Franco y Luna was born in 1572 in Alcalá de Henares, Spain.
On 7 June 1632, he was appointed during the papacy of Pope Urban VIII as Bishop of Durango.
On 31 October 1632, he was consecrated bishop by Francisco Sánchez Villanueva y Vega, Bishop of Mazara del Vallo, with Juan Barahona Zapata del Águila, Bishop of Nicaragua, and Cristóforo Chrisostome Carletti, Bishop of Termia, serving as co-consecrators. On 30 May 1639, he was appointed during the papacy of Pope Urban VIII as Bishop of La Paz. He served as Bishop of La Paz until his death in 1645.

References

External links and additional sources
 (for Chronology of Bishops) 
 (for Chronology of Bishops) 
 (for Chronology of Bishops) 
 (for Chronology of Bishops) 

17th-century Roman Catholic bishops in Mexico
Bishops appointed by Pope Urban VIII
People from Alcalá de Henares
1572 births
1645 deaths
17th-century Roman Catholic bishops in Bolivia
Roman Catholic bishops of La Paz